William Wayne Kilgarlin (November 29, 1932 – November 5, 2012) was a justice of the Supreme Court of Texas from January 1, 1983 to December 31, 1988.

References

Justices of the Texas Supreme Court
1932 births
2012 deaths
20th-century American judges